Lowa may refer to:

 
 Lowa District, a district of the Belgian Congo
 Lowa Khatsa, a dish in Tibetan cuisine
 Lowa language, one of the variants of Central Tibetan

See also
Iowa (disambiguation)